Ken Armstrong is a Grand Prix motorcycle racer from Great Britain.

Career statistics

By season

References

External links
 Profile on motogp.com

British motorcycle racers
500cc World Championship riders